The Chevrolet Sequel is a purpose-built hydrogen fuel cell-powered concept car and sport utility vehicle from Chevrolet, employing the then latest generation of General Motors' fuel cell technology.

The Sequel's powertrain includes an electronic control unit and a fourth-generation version of GM's fuel-cell stack. The Sequel became the basis for the design of the gas-powered Chevrolet Traverse, which was the replacement for the Uplander minivan.

Characteristics

The Sequel is just short of five metres long (4,994 mm, 196.1 in.), on a similarly long (3,040 mm, 119.7 in.) wheelbase in order to accommodate the extremely long fuel tanks.

Possible production
GM made no commitment to building the Sequel. However, GM vice-chairman Bob Lutz has said he would push the company's strategy board to approve full production of a fuel-cell vehicle by 2011 model year. Due to the extremely high cost of fuel cells, GM opted to instead build several hydrogen-powered Chevrolet Equinox-based vehicles as testbeds. It then decided to change its direction of alternative-fueled vehicles, and unveiled the concept Volt in 2008, followed by the production version in 2010.  As of October 2006, GM has built two Sequels.

See also 
 General Motors Hy-wire
 Zero-emissions vehicle

References

External links 

 CHEVROLET SEQUEL 300-MILE ZERO EMISSIONS FUEL CELL DRIVE
 Fahey, J. "GM's wild gamble." In Forbes #175, 25 April 2005, pp. 78–83.
 "The Architect behind the Reinvention of the Automobile"

Crossover sport utility vehicles
Fuel cell vehicles
Hybrid electric cars
Hydrogen cars
Sequel